From Stump to Ship is an amateur industrial film by Alfred K. Ames, former State Senator and owner of the Machias Lumber Company, in Machias, Maine as well as by Dr. Howard Kane of Washington, DC. The half-hour 16mm film was shot over the winter of 1930 in the logging woods and shows logging in the forest with hand tools and horses, then moves to the spring log drive, with loggers using peaveys to break up log jams on icy rivers as the logs are moved from the forest to the mill. Detailed views of mill work, changing the bandsaw, and making shingles.  Lumber is loaded onto schooners in Machias for transport to New York. The film was originally silent, with a typed script which Ames read aloud when he showed the film. In 1985, with funds from the Maine Humanities Council, the narration was recorded with the film.  The film is distributed by Northeast Historic Film, in Bucksport, Maine. Footage was included in the compilation documentary Woodsmen and River Drivers, Another Day, Another Era which also interviewed the surviving woodsmen of the Machias Lumber Company.

In 2002, the film was selected for preservation in the United States National Film Registry by the Library of Congress as being "culturally, historically, or aesthetically significant".

References

External links
From Stump to Ship essay by Karan Sheldon at National Film Registry
From Stump to Ship essay by Daniel Eagan in America's Film Legacy: The Authoritative Guide to the Landmark Movies in the National Film Registry, A&C Black, 2010 , pages 175-176 
From Stump to Ship from the distributor, Northeast Historic Film in Bucksport, Maine.
 "From Stump to Ship: Forgotten Film to the Formation of a Film Archives"
 

1930 films
American documentary films
United States National Film Registry films
American black-and-white films
1930 documentary films
Documentary films about Maine
Black-and-white documentary films
Sponsored films
Films shot in Maine
Logging in the United States
Machias, Maine
1930s English-language films
1930s American films